Richard Andrew Ryder, Baron Ryder of Wensum,  (born 4 February 1949) is a British Conservative Party politician. A former Member of Parliament (MP) and government minister, he was made a life peer in 1997 and was a member of the House of Lords from 1997 to 2021.

Early life
He was educated at Radley College and Magdalene College, Cambridge.

In the 1981 Birthday Honours Ryder was appointed an Officer of the Order of the British Empire (OBE), for political service.

Parliamentary career
Having unsuccessfully fought the Labour seat of Gateshead East in February and October 1974, Ryder was elected at the 1983 general election as MP for the Mid Norfolk constituency. From 1990 to 1995 he was the government's Chief Whip. This period includes the Conservative backbench rebellion over the Maastricht Treaty. The maverick MPs, known as the Maastricht Rebels, were under intense pressure from the government whips but still brought the administration of John Major close to collapse.

Ryder retired from the House of Commons at the 1997 general election, and was created a life peer as Baron Ryder of Wensum, of Wensum in the County of Norfolk on 22 November 1997. He will retire from the Lords on 12 April 2021.

Outside Parliament

He became Vice-Chairman of the BBC on 1 January 2002 for a four-year term.

Ryder was appointed Acting Chairman of the BBC following the resignation of Gavyn Davies on 28 January 2004. Davies resigned following the criticism of the BBC in the Hutton Report, which was set up to investigate "the circumstances surrounding the death of Dr David Kelly". One of Ryder's first acts as chairman was to give a televised statement, during which he offered an unreserved apology for the mistakes made during the Dr. Kelly affair. This apology was criticised by many, including departing Director General, Greg Dyke, as overdone. In the same statement Ryder announced that the process to select a new Chairman had begun, and that he would not be putting his name forward. Michael Grade was appointed on 2 April 2004 and took up his post on 17 May; Ryder resumed the post of Vice-Chairman.

Ryder resigned early on 1 August 2004, after which the position was assumed by Anthony Salz.

Ryder is the Chairman of the Institute of Cancer Research, and is a director of Ipswich Town F.C.

Family
He is a nephew of the late Sue Ryder, the Baroness Ryder of Warsaw.

References

External links 
 
BBC News Profile

|-

|-

|-

|-

|-

|-

|-

1949 births
Alumni of Magdalene College, Cambridge
BBC Governors
Chairmen of the BBC
Conservative Party (UK) life peers
Conservative Party (UK) MPs for English constituencies
Living people
Members of the Privy Council of the United Kingdom
People educated at Radley College
UK MPs 1983–1987
UK MPs 1987–1992
UK MPs 1992–1997
United Kingdom Paymasters General
Officers of the Order of the British Empire
Life peers created by Elizabeth II